Waitemata FC is an amateur football club in Waitemata, Auckland, New Zealand. They compete in the NRFL Northern Conference and play their home games at McLeod Park, Te Atatū South.

Founded in 1959 as Western United, they changed their name to Henderson in 1968 before changing it again to Waitemata City in 1975.

Their best run in the Chatham Cup, New Zealand's premier knock-out competition was in 1982 and 2011 where they made the last sixteen.

References

External links
club website

Association football clubs in Auckland
1959 establishments in New Zealand
Sport in West Auckland, New Zealand